Syncron may refer to:

 Syncron - software company
 Syncron - video game